Willem Jens (22 October 1908 – 4 August 1999) was a Dutch rower. He competed in the men's coxless pair event at the 1936 Summer Olympics.

References

1908 births
1999 deaths
Dutch male rowers
Olympic rowers of the Netherlands
Rowers at the 1936 Summer Olympics
People from Leerdam
Sportspeople from Utrecht (province)
20th-century Dutch people